The Siege of Augustodunum Haeduorum took place in 269-270, Augustodunum (modern-day Autun in Burgundy, eastern France). Victorinus had been declared emperor by the troops located at Augusta Treverorum in the fall of 269. However, only the provinces of Gaul, Germania and Britain recognised him.

Hispania deserted the Gallic Empire and declared its loyalty to Claudius Gothicus. Claudius sent his general Placidianus to Gaul to take on Victorinus. Placidianus captured Cularo. This inspired the city of Augustodunum Haeduorum to abandon Victorinus and declare its intention to declare for Claudius Gothicus. This forced Victorinus to march south and besiege it.

Claudius did not send troops to the city, which fell after seven months. Victorinus’ troops plundered and destroyed the city. However Victorinus would be murdered shortly afterwards.

References

Crisis of the Third Century
Augustodunum Haeduorum
Augustodunum Haeduorum